Layla Alizada (born August 10, 1977) is a Canadian actress, who is best known for appearing in guest roles in some well-known American television shows, including The Muppets and Jane the Virgin, as well as recurring roles in Days of Our Lives and Shut Eye. She's been married to Noel Fisher since 2017.

Career
Alizada began acting in 1995, at the age of 18, appearing in an episode of Strange Luck ("Hat Trick").

Since her debut, she has been offered many guest star roles in a number of American television series, such as Days of Our Lives, where she portrayed Kelly, and Jane the Virgin, portraying Regina.

She has taken part in several noticeable TV shows, including The Muppets and Jane the Virgin. Alizada played Meena, a refugee from Afghanistan in the television movie, "Chasing Freedom" (2004). In "Chasing Freedom," Alizada's character, who has destroyed her identification to escape the Taliban, is unable to prove she should be granted political asylum. From 2016 to 2017, she had a recurring role as Simza on Shut Eye.

Personal life 
Alizada was born in Kabul, Afghanistan; her family relocated to Montreal, Quebec, during her childhood.

Since November 2005, Alizada has been in a relationship with actor Noel Fisher. The couple got engaged in 2014, and married in 2017.

Filmography

Film

Television

See also 
 Afghan Canadians

References

External links

1982 births
Living people
People from Kabul
Actresses from Montreal
Afghan film actresses
Afghan television actresses
Canadian television actresses
Afghan emigrants to Canada
Canadian film actresses